Another World  is an American television soap opera that aired on NBC from May 4, 1964, to June 25, 1999. It was created by Irna Phillips along with William J. Bell, and was produced by Procter & Gamble Productions at NBC Studios, 1268 East 14th Street in Brooklyn.

Set in the fictional town of Bay City, the series originally opened with announcer Bill Wolff intoning its epigram, "We do not live in this world alone, but in a thousand other worlds," which Phillips said represented the difference between "the world of events we live in, and the world of feelings and dreams that we strive for." Another World focused less on the conventional drama of domestic life as seen in other soap operas, and more on exotic melodrama between families of different classes and philosophies.

In 1964, Another World was the first soap opera to talk about abortion when such subjects were taboo. It was the first soap opera to do a crossover, with the character of Mike Bauer from Guiding Light, which was also created by Irna Phillips, coming from Springfield to Bay City. It was also the first to expand to one hour, then to ninety minutes, and then back to an hour. It was the first soap opera to launch two spin-offs, Somerset and Texas, as well as an indirect one, Lovers and Friends, which would be renamed For Richer, For Poorer. Another World was also the second soap opera with a theme song to chart on the Billboard record charts, "(You Take Me Away To) Another World" by Crystal Gayle and Gary Morris, in 1987.

On April 12, 1999, NBC announced it was canceling Another World  with its final episode on the network airing on June 25, 1999. NBC replaced Another World with another soap opera, Passions, on July 5, 1999.

Development

In 1963, NBC approached PGP about Irna Phillips creating a new serial for them. She decided to base it on the concept of living not only in the real life, but simultaneously living in an alternate world of hopes and desires. Attorney Mitchell Dru (played by Geoffrey Lumb), who had previously been a character on As the World Turns, became a character on Another World during the early years of the program (1964-1971). Two characters from another CBS soap opera, The Guiding Light—attorney Mike Bauer and his daughter Hope—did cross over in 1966, remaining for a year before returning to The Guiding Light. Expectations were so high that Another World had six weeks of commercial time sold in advance.

On November 22, 1963, a group of executives (including Executive producer Allen M. Potter and director Tom Donovan) met at the VMLY&R ad agency in New York to discuss the show's opening story, the death of William Matthews, when they heard the news of another death in Dallas: the assassination of President Kennedy.

After opening with a death in the core Matthews family, Irna planned to follow up with an out-of-wedlock pregnancy, a septic abortion, a shooting, and murder trial. As Allen M. Potter explained, "Irna just didn't want to take a chance on waiting for the ratings. She felt that with this kind of showy story she could build an audience more quickly." Said Tom Donovan, "In construction, Irna was attempting to follow the structure of As the World Turns. Irna would never conceive of a story not based on a family."

History

1960s

The Beginning

The first episode was the aftermath of the funeral of wealthy William Matthews. His widow Liz (Audra Lindley) did not like his working-class brother Jim (Leon Janney and later Shepperd Strudwick) or his family. The fights between upper-class Liz and her middle-class in-laws started the show. As the '60s went on, the lives and loves of Jim's children Russ (Sam Groom), Alice (Jacqueline Courtney) and Pat (Susan Trustman) took center stage. Jim's wife Mary (Virginia Dwyer) usually intervened when there was a crisis, which was most of the time.

There was considerable turnover in the cast during the first year of the series.  Sarah Cunningham (Liz Matthews), John Beal (Jim Matthews) and Fran Sharon (Susan Matthews) were all quickly replaced within the first few weeks of the show. By June, Joey Trent (Russ Matthews) and Vera Allen (Grandma Matthews) were written out. By November, Leon Janney (Jim Matthews) was replaced by Shepperd Strudwick and Roni Dengel (Susan Matthews) was written out.

In the first year, the show had a controversial storyline involving Pat having an illegal abortion after becoming pregnant. This was the first time that American television had covered the subject. In the story, the abortion made her sterile, and the shock from the news caused her to find her ex-boyfriend, Tom Baxter (Nicholas Pryor), and shoot him in cold blood. Pat was eventually brought to trial and acquitted. She then fell in love with and married her lawyer, John Randolph (Michael M. Ryan). Trustman left the role of Pat in 1967 and was replaced by Beverly Penberthy.

Another notable early storyline revolved around the star-crossed romance of Bill Matthews (Joseph Gallison) and Melissa Palmer (Carol Roux). Liz did not consider Melissa good enough for her son and was constantly interfering in their relationship. After many trials and hardships, Bill and Melissa were finally married, but their happiness was short-lived when Bill drowned in a boating accident.

After a one-year run NBC was expected to cancel the program but instead, former soap opera actor James Lipton was hired to write the show. His ideas included bringing underused members of the Matthews family (Jim, Mary, and Alice) into the forefront and introducing the Gregory family; however, the Gregory family came and went fairly quickly. Agnes Nixon, then-head writer of The Guiding Light, was hired after Lipton's departure to write for the program.

Rachel Davis
In 1967, Nixon created the show's most iconic character: Rachel Davis (Robin Strasser). Rachel was raised by her single mother, Ada (Constance Ford), who provided a good foil for Rachel. Down-to-earth Ada could sit in her kitchen on Bowman Street and be perfectly content with her life. Rachel on the other hand was a schemer, determined to escape her impoverished background even if it meant resorting to underhanded means.

Rachel thought she had hit the jackpot when she married Russ Matthews, but then she met wealthy businessman Steve Frame (George Reinholt). Originally from Chadwell, Oklahoma, Steve had also grown up poor and he bonded with Rachel over their respective pasts, but it was Rachel's sister-in-law, Alice, who stole Steve's heart. Alice was sophisticated, shy, and demure — everything Rachel was not. One night, after an argument with Alice, Steve slept with Rachel. Steve and Alice were to marry in 1969, but it was called off when Rachel crashed their engagement party with the news that she was carrying Steve's child. She later gave birth to a son named Jamie and, for a time, passed him off as Russ's son. The truth about Jamie's paternity eventually came out, ending Rachel's marriage to Russ.

1970s

Steve, Alice, and Rachel

The love triangle involving Steve, Alice, and Rachel took Another World to the top of the ratings. In June 1970, Alice went to live in France after suffering a breakdown. In her absence, Steve and Rachel bonded yet again, this time over their son, Jamie. Alice eventually returned and reunited with Steve. The star-crossed lovers finally married.

When Robert Cenedella stepped down as head writer in 1971, sponsor Procter & Gamble hired a newcomer, playwright Harding Lemay, to write the program. Lemay's screenplays took the form of tragic plays, as they were carried out in five dramatic acts. Many people consider Lemay's tenure the Golden Age of Another World.

Victoria Wyndham took over the role of Rachel from Robin Strasser in 1972 and remained in the role until the end of the show's run. Rachel was thoroughly convinced Jamie (Robert Doran) would be instrumental in breaking up the Frame marriage and snagging her Steve once and for all. She enlisted the help of her drifter father, Gerald (Walter Mathews), who tricked Alice into finding Steve and Rachel in a compromising position. Alice filed for divorce and left town again. Fed up with Alice's wavering ways and feeling a duty to have more of a role in his son's life, Steve married Rachel.

Steve tried to settle into his new life with Rachel and Jamie, but Alice was always on his mind. When Alice returned to Bay City, she exposed Rachel and Gerald's scheme. Steve divorced Rachel and reunited with Alice. Steve was charged with bribing Rachael's father after Gerald Davis lied in court that Steve offered him a bribe to help him get a divorce from Rachel, and Steve was sentenced to prison. The day before he began his sentence, Steve and Alice married for the second time (on AWs tenth-anniversary telecast). Rachel continued to scheme, even trying to evict Alice from the house Steve had given her, causing Alice to have another mental breakdown. The triangle finally ended when Steve was supposedly killed in a helicopter crash in Australia.

As the show rose higher in the ratings, NBC brass wished to expand the show to an hour; the first regularly scheduled hour-long episode was telecast on January 6, 1975.

Mac, Rachel, and Iris

Rachel began a new chapter in her life and stopped being the conniving troublemaker she had been for years. Lemay and actress Victoria Wyndham wanted to explore a portrayal of Rachel with more facets to her character beyond a one-note villainess, the "black" to "white," good Alice.

Rachel's redemption came into focus when she met wealthy publisher, Mac Cory (Douglass Watson). Originally, Mac was intended to be a love interest for Liz Matthews, but Lemay noticed the chemistry between Watson and Wyndham and wrote a love story for them. Fearing backlash from viewers who may have found an older man-younger woman relationship tasteless, Lemay penned a number of chance encounters for the two characters, which allowed the characters to get to know each other through innocent yet intimate conversations.

Mac and Rachel were married on Valentine's Day 1975. Mac accepted Jamie as his own child, but the same could not be said for Mac's daughter, Iris Carrington (Beverlee McKinsey). Iris was a glamorous socialite who had left her husband Eliot (James Douglas), and their son Dennis (Mike Hammett) to go jet-setting. She was insanely jealous and resented Rachel, who she saw as beneath her family. The drama produced by Iris interfering in Mac and Rachel's marriage was the catalyst for the show for the rest of the '70s. Iris pulled numerous schemes to drive Rachel and Mac apart, even ignoring Rachel's pleas for help when she was having a miscarriage. This was the final straw for Mac and he disowned Iris. After the birth of Mac and Rachel's daughter, Amanda (Nicole Catalanotto), it was revealed that Iris was adopted, which devastated her.

The presence of the Cory maid, Louise Goddard (Anne Meacham), provided comedic relief in otherwise dramatic storylines. Louise also served as a stern confidante and a sometime voice of reason for the Cory family.

Core families
The Matthews, Frame, and Ewing families played a key role on the program for much of the 1970s.

Many Frame family members moved to Bay City from Chadwell, Oklahoma. Sharlene Frame (Laurie Heineman) married Russ (now played by David Bailey), who physically abused her. Willis Frame (John Fitzpatrick) fell in love with Angie Perrini (Toni Kalem). Angie later married Willis's brother, Vince (Jay Morran) while Willis married Gwen Parrish (Dorothy Lyman). Willis and Angie had an affair, but, after suffering miscarriage, Angie left town. After Steve's death, Alice became a backburner character for the first time in eleven years, in tune with Lemay's wish that Jacqueline Courtney leave the show. Recast with Susan Harney, Alice became a registered nurse, and adopted an orphaned girl named Sally (Cathy Greene).

Claxton, Wyoming native Blaine Ewing (Laura Malone) arrived in town to continue the summer romance she had with Jamie (now played by Tim Holcomb). Jamie and Blaine later married, much to Rachel's disapproval. Blaine's brother, Larry (Rick Porter), became a police officer and married Clarice Hobson (Gail Brown).

For many years, John and Pat had been one of Bay City's most stable couples and loving parents to their twins, Michael (Lionel Johnston) and Marianne (Ariana Chase). However, they began experiencing marital problems and divorced. John went on to marry the maniacal Olive Gordon (Jennifer Leak). Olive committed a reign of terror on John and his family: she cheated on John with Evan Webster (Barry Jenner), blackmailed Marianne to leave town, and ruined Michael's marriage to Molly Ordway (Rolanda Mendelle), among other misdeeds. Believing John was cheating on her with Alice, Olive decided to murder Alice. The March 6, 1979, episode saw Olive set a building on fire with Alice trapped inside. John rescued Alice and was killed in the process.

The 90-minute expansion
The sensational, special effects-laden episode coincided with the move to 90-minute episodes each weekday. The details of the episode were meant to be kept secret from the press, but they were leaked a month before the scenes aired. Both Guiding Light and The Edge of Night decided to counteract with their own shocking episodes to air in the same time slot: the rape of Holly Thorpe by her husband Roger (Guiding Light) and the shocking murder storyline of Wade Meecham (The Edge of Night), respectively. The reason for the change was 'Another World's ratings had gone to #1 in 1978 tied with sister P&G soap As The World Turns on CBS. This was for overall ratings in daytime TV. In order to keep the top spot, executive producer, Paul Rauch, pitched the idea to NBC to make the show longer. The change prompted Lemay to quit after eight years, citing overwork.

At first, the ratings got a slight boost, but most viewers did not like the change to longer episodes. The episode duration opened up space for many new characters to be introduced, but most of them did not catch on with the audience. The soap opera also started facing strong competition from ABC's General Hospital now  enjoying  a significant resurgence in the ratings starting around mid-1978 under the direction of Gloria Monty with its action-packed and youth-oriented storylines. This ratings surge also help ABC's other two hour long soaps as well, with ABC taking the top three spots in the ratings.

1980s
Iris moves to Texas

In the final months of the 90-minute experiment, many characters debuted on Another World in storylines that focused on Iris as she planned a move to Houston.

This fictional move was incorporated in the new spin-off serial, Texas, which debuted on August 4, 1980. The initial concept was for a show set in the Antebellum South entitled Reunion, but NBC wanted something more in line with the hugely successful primetime soap, Dallas. The show was renamed Texas and series producer, Paul Rauch, chose to have it revolve around Iris. Iris initially set out to visit her son, Dennis (now played by Jim Poyner), who had relocated from Bay City to Houston. Within a matter of weeks, Iris became involved with her first love (and Dennis's biological father), Alex Wheeler (Bert Kramer).

A range of new characters, who had been introduced in the storyline connected to Iris's move, also moved to the new series. To accommodate Texas, Another World went back to 60 minutes, and was moved from 2:30 p.m. to 2:00 pm.  Two million viewers defected from the show, partly due to McKinsey's departure, and the time change, which now  put Another World head to head with  sister P&G serial As the World Turns  on CBS and ABC's One Life to Live the three soaps went head to head at 2:00 pm until 'As the World Turns was moved back to its original 1:30 slot  in a network shift with P&G sister soap " Search For Tomorrow which moved to NBC in 1982 joining  & Capitol  that lasted 5 years, until 'As the World Turns return to 2pm in 1987 until it was canceled in 2010 and until Another World was canceled in May of 1999. One Life to Live   was canceled in  2012. The influx of new characters who then moved to Texas also contributed to the audience erosion. As a result, the move to 90-minute installments is generally regarded as a failure.

Mac, Rachel, Janice, Mitch, (and again) Steve and Alice
Mac and Rachel had their own marital troubles, mostly regarding Rachel's decision to work full-time as a sculptress. Mac became close with the editor of Brava magazine (a part of Cory Publishing), Janice Frame (Christine Jones), who was also Steve's sister. Rachel and Mac began fighting regularly, which eventually led to a divorce. Janice and Mac married, but she only wanted him for his money. Janice was having an affair with photographer and owner of a popular local nightclub, Mitch Blake (William Gray Espy), and the two plotted to kill Mac and acquire his estate.

The Mac/Rachel/Janice/Mitch storyline had carried on for a year when it culminated in scenes shot on location shooting in St. Croix. To crack the scheme that Rachel suspected Janice was spearheading, Rachel slept with Mitch, who by then had backed out of Janice's plan. Rachel found Mac in St. Croix just as the poison Janice had given him was taking effect. After stabbing Mitch, who revealed he was on Rachel's side in the end, Janice then engaged in a scuffle involving the same knife with Rachel, with the two women falling into a swimming pool. Only Rachel came out alive, having killed Janice in self-defense.

Weeks later, Rachel was mortified to find out that she was pregnant with Mitch's child, but she still remarried Mac. When Mitch was supposedly murdered by Rachel, she was put on trial. During the trial it came out that Mitch was the father of Rachel's baby, which devastated Mac. Rachel was found guilty and sentenced to eight years in prison. Shortly after, she gave birth to a son named Matthew (Matthew Maienczyk). It turned out Mitch was still alive and was suffering from amnesia. Rachel was set free and the future seemed bright for the Cory family, but then Mitch and Rachel began an affair. Rachel decided to start a new life with Mitch and divorced Mac.

Further straining the Cory family was the arrival of Mac's illegitimate son, Sandy Alexander (Christopher Rich). Jamie (now played by Richard Bekins) and Sandy formed a brotherly relationship, but it was damaged when Jamie's scheming wife, Cecile (Nancy Frangione), and Sandy had an affair. Cecile and Sandy married and had a daughter named Maggie (Nicole Schrink). Sandy left Cecile when he realized what kind of woman she was and started a relationship with Blaine Ewing. Mac became engaged to Rachel's former rival Alice Frame (now played by Vana Tribbey), who had returned to Bay City and was serving as his private nurse following a near-fatal gunshot wound.

Steve Frame (now played by David Canary) was "resurrected" in 1981, first masquerading as the mysterious, wealthy Edward Black. It was revealed he was suffering amnesia and had had plastic surgery. Alice (now played by Linda Borgeson) broke off her engagement to Mac and reunited with Steve. Rachel ended her relationship with Mitch and returned to Bay City from San Francisco. Mitch kidnapped Matthew, but luckily he was caught and sent to prison. Rachel and Steve reconnected and, after his relationship with Alice went sour and she left town, they reunited. Sadly, on their wedding day, a car accident claimed Steve's life—this time for good. Rachel was blinded in the accident and Mac helped her recover. They fell in love again and were married in a double wedding in the summer of 1983, along with Sandy and Blaine. In 1984, Alice (once again played by Jacqueline Courtney) returned to Bay City now as a doctor tending to Rachel during her bout with amnesia after being kidnapped by Carl Hutchins (Charles Keating). Courtney's return as the original Alice gave viewers a chance during this time to see the two women 
rehash their past history, clearing the air, settling their differences, and ending the long time rivalry once and for all that carried the show through the 1970's .

A new Another World
Between 1981 and 1982, almost the entire Matthews family left the canvas: Pat moved to New York City, Marianne (now played by Beth Collins) left to resurrect her marriage to Rick Halloway (Tony Cummings), Russ departed for Seattle, Alice left to attend medical school, and patriarch Jim died (his portrayer, Hugh Marlowe, had died in May 1982). Only Liz, her granddaughter, Julia Shearer (Kyra Sedgwick), and Sally (now played by Jennifer Runyon) remained in Bay City.

After the departure of the Matthews family, the wealthy Love family was introduced. They were made up of siblings Peter (John Hutton), Donna (Anna Stuart), Nicole (Kim Morgan Greene), and Marley (Ellen Wheeler), who was actually Donna's daughter. Their tyrannical father, Reginald (John Considine), came back from the dead to cause trouble for his children. He had spent the last twenty years living under the alias LaSalle and had a whole other family, a wife, Marissa (Denise Alexander), who was none other than Mary McKinnon suffering from amnesia, and an adopted son, Scott (Hank Cheyne). Drug addict Nicole had a nervous breakdown after accidentally shooting and killing her father's enemy, Jason Frame (Chris Robinson). Jason, who had worked as a stable boy for the Love family, had an affair with Reginald's first wife and had witnessed her murder at Reginald's hands.

Donna had started off as a snobbish troublemaker, a la Iris, but mellowed somewhat when she married the love of her life, stable boy-turned-businessman Michael Hudson (Kale Browne). Michael and Donna had had identical twins, Vicky (also played by Ellen Wheeler) and Marley, when they were teenagers. Unknown to Donna, Vicky was put up for adoption by Reginald and grew up poor in Lassiter, Pennsylvania. Vicky came to town with her nanny, Bridget Connell (Barbara Berjer), and her best friend, Jake McKinnon (Tom Eplin) and they planned to swindle the Love family, but then Jake fell in love with Marley. Vicky eventually bonded with her biological family and Jake married Marley.

Two extremely popular characters were introduced: playboy lawyer, Cass Winthrop (Stephen Schnetzer), and glamorous novelist, Felicia Gallant (Linda Dano). Both became mainstays in Bay City until the end of the show's run.

The Romance
Many popular love stories emerged in the 1980s.

Felicia fell in love with ex-con, Mitch Blake, and the two had a storybook wedding. A down-to-earth love story came about between troubled Vietnam vet, John Hudson (David Forsyth), and a newly returned Sharlene Frame (now played by Anna Kathryn Holbrook). Jamie (now played by Laurence Lau) and Lisa Grady (Joanna Going) were going to tie the knot, but Vicky (now played by Anne Heche) broke them up when she became pregnant by Jamie. The pairing of Cass and journalist, Kathleen McKinnon (Julie Osburn), also proved extremely popular.

Sally Frame (now played by Mary Page Keller) fell for Blaine and Larry's long-lost half-brother, Catlin Ewing (Thomas Ian Griffith), and ran out on her wedding to David Thatcher (Lewis Arlt) to be with him. When David was murdered, Catlin took the fall thinking Sally had murdered him, but she had not. After going on the run, Catlin was cleared and the pair married. Their marriage was declared invalid when Catlin's presumed-dead wife, Brittany Peterson (Sharon Gabet), arrived in town. Sally (now played by Taylor Miller) and Catlin legally married a year later, even though Catlin knew Brittany was pregnant with his child and was claiming Peter Love (now played by Marcus Smythe) was the father. Sally was tragically killed in a car accident caused by Reginald mere days after her wedding to Catlin.

Police officers M.J. McKinnon (Sally Spencer) and Adam Cory (Ed Fry) fell in love. M.J. desperately tried to hide her past as a high class prostitute in Chicago from Adam. Her secret unfolded when her former pimp and lover, Chad Rollo (Richard Burgi), arrived in town and then a video of M.J. having sex with a mob boss surfaced. Adam ended their engagement and M.J. moved to Minnesota. Later, Adam realized he still loved MJ, Contacted her and they got back together. 

In 1987, the series broke new ground when they introduced Chad's sister, Dawn (Barbara Tyson). Dawn fell in love with Scott, but then she learned she was HIV-positive. She had contracted the virus from a blood transfusion from her prostitute mother. Scott stuck by his girlfriend until Dawn tragically died in his arms. This was the first HIV/AIDS-related storyline to air on a daytime soap opera in the United States.

The Old and New Generation
The late 1980s saw the two core families of Another World fill out the canvas: new generations of the Cory and Matthews families, as well as the return of older characters.

By 1986, all of the remaining members of the Matthews family had been written out, but the family began to reemerge in the late 1980s when Irene Dailey (Liz Matthews) returned on a recurring basis, David Bailey (Russ Matthews) started making guest appearances, and Allison Hossack came on as Russ's daughter, Olivia. Liz was, as usual, the town busybody, while Russ was stunned to learn he was the father of Sharlene's daughter, Josie Watts (Alexandra Wilson), and Olivia pursued a dancing career.

Mac and Rachel's two youngest children came back as teenagers, Amanda was now played by Sandra Ferguson and Matthew Cory by Matt Crane. Amanda married budding artist, Sam Fowler (Robert Kelker-Kelly), and they had a daughter, Alli (Kerri Ann Darling), initially to Mac's dismay as Sam was Mitch Blake's younger brother. Matthew started a relationship with Josie, much to both of their families' disapproval due to the ugly history between the Corys and the Frames.

Iris (now played by Carmen Duncan) returned to Bay City in 1988. She revealed she was in fact Mac's biological daughter (her birth mother had confessed this on her deathbed). With this knowledge, Iris was more determined than ever to win her beloved "Daddy" over once and for all. Iris claimed she was a changed woman, but it soon became apparent she was up to no good. She set up a dummy corporation called Bennett Publishing, which she ran under the code name "The Chief." Her plan was to use her company to take down Cory Publishing so she could rush in and save it, winning Mac over in the process. Rachel and Donna uncovered the truth, and Iris had to confess all to Mac, who was devastated and left for Maine to ponder the implications.

Turning Point: Mac's death
Throughout the 1980s, the Cory family continued to be fan favorites, but the family's importance on the show was shaken when Mac Cory's portrayer, Douglass Watson, died unexpectedly of a myocardial infarction while on vacation in Arizona on May 1, 1989. At the time of Watson's death, Another World was about to celebrate its 25th anniversary, which writers had scripted in the form of a 25th anniversary celebration for Brava magazine. The Corys, minus Mac, hosted a gala that featured the return of several veteran characters, including original characters Alice Frame (Jacqueline Courtney) and Pat Randolph (Beverly Penberthy). It also featured a mystical sequence with Rachel coaxed back from near-death by the ghost of her ex-husband Steve (George Reinholt reprising the role), thwarting Janice's attempt to lure Rachel "into the light".

Watson's death was written into the show with Mac dying of a heart attack off-screen while in Maine. Rachel, her family, and a few returning characters tearfully buried Mac on the June 16, 1989, episode. Without Watson, the show was left without a unifying center and it was up to Victoria Wyndham to fill that void. However, much of the show's focus shifted to Vicky Hudson.

Vicky was the town schemer, very reminiscent of Rachel at her worst back in the 1960s and 70s, while Marley remained the "good" twin. Vicky married Jamie and gave birth to a son named Steven, while Marley reconciled with Jake after they nearly divorced. It soon came out that Jake had a one-night stand with Vicky and might be Steven's father. Jamie turned out to be the father, but both marriages were destroyed. After an intense custody battle, Jamie won full custody of Steven.

In Mac's will, Iris, Amanda, and Rachel had all been left equal shares of Cory Publishing. Rachel attempted to head the company and counter Iris's continued interference. When the vote for President of Cory Publishing came down, Rachel and Iris were tied. Vicky offered to use her shares to vote for Rachel if she was given custody of Steven, but Rachel turned her down. In an unforgettable moment, Vicky walked into the Cory Publishing boardroom and, to get back at Rachel for rejecting her blackmail, broke the tie by voting for Iris.

1990s

A New Era
The absence of Mac continued to affect the show as it moved into the new decade. However, some of the show's most popular storylines came about in the 1990s.

After divorcing Mitch, Felicia was reunited with her old flame, Lucas Castigliano (John Aprea). Lucas hunted Felicia down in an attempt to find their daughter, who turned out to be none other than Felicia's enemy, Lorna Devon (Alicia Coppola). Lorna had gone behind the scenes at Felicia's talk show and switched the live footage with a pornographic videotape that Lucas and Felicia's adoptive daughter, Jenna Norris (Alla Korot), had unwittingly made. Felicia and Lucas ended up repairing their relationship with Lorna, but their time as a family was short-lived when Lucas was murdered. Meanwhile, Jenna found true love with rocker Dean Frame (Ricky Paull Goldin). Their happiness, and Dean's success as a rock star, was chronicled in the nighttime special, Summer Desire, which also focused on the relationships with Cass and Frankie, Ryan and Vicki, and Paulina and Jake.

Mac's death ushered in the appearance of his illegitimate daughter, Paulina Cantrell (Cali Timmins), who fought to prove her legitimacy as a Cory. Cass Winthrop fell in love with eccentric private investigator Frankie Frame (Alice Barrett) and they married. It was later revealed that Cass's presumed-dead wife Kathleen, was actually alive and in the Witness Protection Program. Cass left Frankie for Kathleen, but later realized his mistake and did everything in his power to win Frankie back. Sharlene was diagnosed with dissociative identity disorder and was terrorized by her psychiatrist, Dr. Taylor Benson (Christine Andreas), who was obsessed with John. Sharlene was later presumed dead in a boat explosion engineered by Taylor.

The 1990 story Who shot Jake McKinnon? was one of the biggest storylines the show ever told. After his split from Marley, Jake threw caution to the wind and began scheming his way through Bay City. He blackmailed Iris after she bribed him to prove Paulina was not Mac's daughter, blackmailed Paulina with fake proof that Mac was not her father, and slept with his former mother-in-law, Donna. Donna ended up losing custody of her and Michael's foster son, Mikey, when Stacey Winthrop (Hilary Edson) blackmailed Donna about her one-night-stand with Jake. Marley and Jake reconciled once again, but then she found out that he was in the midst of an affair with Paulina. When Marley dumped Jake, he became enraged and raped her. He was later shot by a mystery assailant.

Jake survived and the list of suspects included Vicky, Marley, Donna, Paulina, and Iris. Marley was charged with Jake's attempted murder, though she was innocent. In order to garner sympathy from the jury, Cass forced a reluctant Marley to reveal the rape on the stand. This made Donna confess to the shooting, though she too was innocent. The perpetrator remained a mystery until Jake awoke from his coma and remembered the night in question: it was none other than Paulina who had shot him! Instead of turning her in, Jake decided to blackmail Paulina in order to use her for his own nefarious purposes, including trying to break up Marley's relationship with Jamie (now played by Russell Todd). Jake eventually forced Paulina to marry him to get his hands on the Cory fortune.

Vicky's romance with kindhearted police officer, Ryan Harrison (Paul Michael Valley), became one of the show's most popular love stories of the '90s. However, Vicky (now played by Jensen Buchanan) ruined her relationship with Ryan when she cheated on him with his brother, Grant (Mark Pinter). Amanda saw her marriage to Sam crash and burn when she had an affair with Janice's son, Evan Frame (Charles Grant). Marley and Jamie's relationship fell apart due to her inability to become pregnant.

Between 1992 and 1993, there was another Matthews family exodus: Olivia left town because she was pregnant by Iris's son, Dennis (now played by Chris Bruno), Liz departed, and Russ made his last appearance.

Renewal
Despite low ratings, the show was renewed in 1993. The lower rated Santa Barbara was given the axe instead. But Another Worlds ratings still were not performing well, becoming the second-lowest rated soap opera on U.S. television at the time (ahead of only ABC's Loving) after Santa Barbaras cancellation. The odds were not in the show's favor that it would be renewed again.

When Rachel's beloved mother, Ada Hobson, died, (corresponding with the death of her portrayer, Constance Ford), she needed support more than ever, and she found it in the unlikeliest of persons -- reformed villain Carl Hutchins. The two fell in love and became engaged. Iris did not like this news one bit, and at Rachel and Carl's wedding, she planned to startle Carl by firing blanks at him. Evan (now played by Eric Scott Woods) placed real bullets into Iris's gun, causing Iris to  actually end up wounding Carl. She was convicted of the crime and sent to prison.

Matthew Cory developed a May–December romance with his business partner, Donna Hudson. Vicky married Grant, but left him to reunite with Ryan. Vicky later gave birth to Grant's son, Kirkland (Austin and Evan Tennenbaum), and the two fought tooth and nail over the child. Cass and Frankie were finally legally wed and they honeymooned on the Orient Express. Sharlene turned up alive and reunited with John. Jake and Paulina (now played by Judi Evans) beat the odds and fell in love for real, but continued to have a tumultuous relationship.

The show also covered many social issue storylines, including sexual assault, mental disorder, and alcoholism. When Lorna was raped after a night of heavy drinking, viewers watched as she dealt with the aftermath of her brutal attack. She originally pointed the finger at Morgan Winthrop (Grayson McCouch), but her rapist turned out to be Kyle Barkley (Roger Floyd). Cass and Frankie were devastated when their daughter, Charlie (Lindsay Fabes), became ill. Luckily, she recovered, but Cass had begun acting strangely. He was diagnosed with bipolar disorder, which had been triggered by Charlie's illness. Again, viewers were informed: they learned both the symptoms of the illness and how to treat it by watching Cass see a counselor and start to take medication. Felicia had begun drinking heavily after Lucas's death, but she refused to call herself an alcoholic, and she was furious when her friends staged an intervention. When her adopted daughter, Jenna, had a miscarriage and Felicia was too drunk to help her, she finally admitted she was an alcoholic and found help through Alcoholics Anonymous.

Changes at the top
In early 1995, news at the top signaled a change in executive producer. Jill Farren Phelps, who had won Daytime Emmy Award for her work on Santa Barbara, was given the job. Phelps would go on to make many controversial decisions. She made several changes to take the show in a more youthful direction. Both cast members over 60, Barbara Berjer (Bridget Connell) and David Hedison (Spencer Harrison), were fired. Even though Matthew and Donna were a popular couple, Phelps insisted the characters be paired with others their own age so they were broken up when Donna cheated with her ex-husband, Michael.

Many other romances began and ended. After years of putting up with Jake's cons, swindles, and lies, Paulina had enough and left him to tie the knot with police officer, Joe Carlino (Joseph Barbara). John and Sharlene's marriage was ruined by John's affair with Felicia. Grant wrecked his marriage to Amanda (now played by Christine Tucci) by cheating on her with Lorna (now played by Robin Christopher). Police trainee Josie (now played by Amy Carlson) fell for her instructor, Gary Sinclair (Timothy Gibbs).

Rachel gave birth to twins, even though she was in her early fifties. Although the believability of this story was debated by fans, it was a nod back to when her mother, Ada, gave birth to Rachel's sister Nancy late in life. Robert Kelker-Kelly was lured back to the show, but not in his former role of Sam Fowler. Instead, he came on as the mysterious Bobby Reno, a love interest for Vicky. Bobby's backstory became convoluted when his identity was rewritten as a fugitive named Shane Roberts and his former wife, Lila (Lisa Peluso), came to town to reclaim him. Vicky began dating her lifelong friend Jake and they later married.

Controversy and decline
In 1995, the show aired one of its most maligned storylines of all-time, which involved show matriarch Rachel Cory Hutchins being kidnapped and then impersonated by an evil doppelgänger countess, Justine Duvalier (also played by Victoria Wyndham). It was panned by the soap press as being worthy of a Mystery Science Theater 3000 level of ridicule. During the storyline, the show was dealt another major blow when fan favorite Paul Michael Valley was fired and his character, Ryan, was killed off. Fans were relieved when Justine's reign of terror was put to an end when Carl finished her off with a letter opener. Wyndham was quoted as liking the storyline at first, but after it played out, she stated that she wished she had never appeared in it.

In 1996, budget cuts caused Phelps to institute a serial killer storyline. Phelps decided to kill off one major character and it was originally decided that popular character Donna Hudson would be offed, but massive fan protest caused Phelps to scrap that plan. Phelps then decided to kill off either Frankie Frame or Paulina Carlino. When a focus group responded lukewarm to Frankie but warmer to Paulina, Phelps gave the greenlight to axe Frankie. Frankie was one of the show's most beloved characters and when word got out about her exit, another massive rampage of fan protests arose. Phelps asked then-head writer Margaret DePriest to re-write Frankie's exit so that the character would at least still live. DePriest, eager to satisfy her wish to see Frankie's husband, Cass, return to his former rogue ways, vehemently refused. Frankie was murdered in what many people felt were overly brutal and gruesome scenes.

After the panned Justine story and the deaths of Ryan and Frankie, AW took a serious blow in the ratings. The show continued to decline, which eventually led to its demise.

Cancellation
On April 12, 1999, as part of a shakeup of the network's daytime and early morning schedules (in which NBC also canceled NBC News at Sunrise (with newcomer Early Today replacing it as the network's early-morning newscast) and picked up the daytime talk show Later Today (a short-lived spinoff of Today) in exchange for the withdrawal of the talk show Leeza (which was renewed for the 1999–2000 season) from the network's schedule), NBC announced that it would not renew Another World, ending the series' run after 35 years once the show's previous renewal agreement ended that June. Many reasons abounded for Another World cancellation, with one of the more notable events occurring in the summer of 1998: the network's San Francisco affiliate at the time, KRON-TV (now a MyNetworkTV affiliate) – at the time one of NBC's highest-rated stations – stopped airing the show altogether, leaving Days of Our Lives and Sunset Beach as the only NBC soap operas that the station cleared on its schedule, resulting in additional erosion of the program's already below-mediocre ratings. Independent station KICU-TV picked up the show and aired it for the rest of its run, but the series still experienced a steep ratings decline in the Bay Area market as KRON refused to guide viewers to the program's new home.

Another reason behind the cancellation decision was that a new soap opera produced and owned by NBC (through its NBC Studios unit), Passions, had entered into production and was slated to begin airing on the network in the summer of 1999. To add Passions to its daytime schedule, NBC opted to cancel one of its existing serials instead of reclaiming one hour of programming time allocated for syndicated or local programming from its stations, like what happened in January 1997 when the network placed Sunset Beach in the 12:00 p.m. timeslot. Rumors abounded that Days of Our Lives would be canceled (despite being NBC's highest-rated daytime series), as renewal talks between NBC and Columbia Pictures Television (now Sony Pictures Television) were going poorly at the time (at the same time, there were rumors that ABC would cancel Port Charles to make room for Days of Our Lives on its schedule). There were also rumors that the low-rated, younger-skewing soap Sunset Beach (the lowest-rated of NBC's three daytime serials at the time) would be canceled.Days of Our Lives was ultimately renewed for five more years (through March 2004) in September 1998, leaving only the fates of Another World and Sunset Beach up in the air until the following April, when the cancellation of Another World was announced. Sunset Beach was picked up through the end of 1999 (largely due to its slightly better ratings in the younger demographics) before being canceled itself, with its final episode airing on December 31 of that year.

The final episode of Another World aired on June 25, 1999. The episode revolved around the wedding of Cass and Lila. In the show's final scene, Rachel and Carl happily embraced in the Cory living room, she remarked "All's well that ends well," and, after looking at the pictures of all her loved ones, Rachel went upstairs with Carl. The final image was a still frame of Mac raising a champagne glass in a celebratory toast, before the episode faded to black.Passions replaced Another World on NBC's daytime schedule beginning on July 5, 1999; NBC's daytime coverage of the 1999 Wimbledon Championships aired during the intervening week.

After the final episode

On January 3, 2000, the show's former NBC studio in Brooklyn became the home to As the World Turns, which had moved from CBS Broadcast Center.

Several Another World characters were moved to As the World Turns starting in the summer of 1999, almost immediately after Another World ended; this was made possible by the fact that both shows were produced and owned by Procter and Gamble. Lila (Lisa Peluso), Cass (Stephen Schnetzer), Vicky (Jensen Buchanan), Marley (Ellen Wheeler), Donna (Anna Stuart), and Jake (Tom Eplin) all became involved in storylines on As the World Turns, or at the very least made guest appearances.  By 2002, Vicky and Jake had been killed off violently in separate incidents, and the crossover experiment had, for the most part, ended. Schnetzer continued to make occasional appearances, as his character of Cass was used as a "visiting lawyer" in As the World Turns trials. The character of Cass also appeared in a few episodes of Guiding Light in 2002.

The show was commemorated in print twice in 1999.  Another World, the 35th Anniversary Celebration, by Julie Poll, was a coffee-table style book chronicling the show's history on- and off-screen. Another World was the last of all the long-running soap opera programs of the time to be preserved in this way. The other book was decidedly different; The Ultimate Another World Trivia Book, by Gerard J. Waggett, listed several juicy tidbits about the show's stars and what happened behind-the-scenes.  Many fans have treated Poll's book as they would a high school yearbook by getting Another World performers to sign their autographs in the book along with messages of appreciation or thanks for the fans' continued support in watching the program.

From July 2003 to April 2007, SOAPnet, an ABC channel, started rerunning old Another World episodes that originally aired from July 1, 1987, to May 10, 1991. SOAPnet stopped airing reruns of Another World to make room on its schedule for reruns of One Tree Hill and The O.C..The Another World Reunion aired on SOAPnet on October 24, 2003. Hosted by Linda Dano, the special program reunited fan favorites such as Stephen Schnetzer, Sandra Ferguson, John Aprea, Alicia Coppola, Kale Browne, and Ellen Wheeler. On the special, Dano interviewed the members of the assembled cast, one by one, interspersed with classic Another World clips. Before and after commercial breaks, Another World trivia questions were posed to the audience at home, and audience members told the viewers at home their favorite Another World moments, supplemented with clips from the actual episodes. For example, one viewer said her favorite Another World moment was from 1980, in which a pregnant Rachel, on trial for Mitch's murder, was forced to tell Mac that Matthew was Mitch's son and not his. Another viewer cited Ryan marrying Vicky while in Heaven.  This special was nominated for a Daytime Emmy Award for Outstanding Special Class Special in 2004. The Another World Reunion was rerun in May 2004 to commemorate Another Worlds 40th anniversary.

In 2006, Procter & Gamble began making several of its soap operas available, a few episodes at a time, through America Online's AOL Video service, downloadable free of charge.  Reruns of older Another World episodes began from August 1, 1980. As of January 2009, Procter & Gamble announced that Another World and three other of its cancelled soap operas would no longer be streamed on America Online Video. The notice referred to exploring other options to make the shows available for viewing.

On July 29, 2008, episodes also became available on the video streaming website Hulu. The episodes begin with the May 10, 1991, episode – the last one that ran on SOAPnet. There were 24 episodes made available initially, with the promise of 3 more each week. As of December 2009, the same episodes seen through Hulu were also available through YouTube. Hulu stopped airing episodes of the soap on October 21, 2010. The last Another World episode to air on the site was October 5, 1992.

TeleNext Media also introduced a new website in April 2009 that continued Another World. The site was called Another World Today (anotherworldtoday.com) and essentially picked up 10 years after Another Worlds last episode in a blog/fan fiction format. Readers could submit story ideas to help form the story angles and pacing of the so-called 'sequel'.  Each webisode came out weekly and the website also showed classic clips of Another World. By 2011, the site became no longer affiliated with TeleNext Media and was independently run until December 2014, when it stopped publishing new episodes.

Cast

Another World started off with the Matthews family as the core family. The Cory family later became the main focus. Other families included the Randolphs, Frames, Hudsons, Loves, Ewings, and Harrisons.

Broadcast history
For most of a 15-year period between 1965 and 1980, Another World was NBC's highest-rated soap opera. During that time, NBC ran a 90-minute drama block consisting of Days of Our Lives, The Doctors and Another World, all of which enjoyed great ratings and critical success before declining at the end of the 1970s.

The 1960s
Another World did not take long to establish itself as NBC's highest-rated daytime drama, although it was still behind the then-dominant CBS lineup which would usually occupy the first six places on the ratings chart. Making its debut at 3 p.m. Eastern/2 Central, Another World slowly chipped away at ABC's General Hospital and CBS' daytime version of To Tell the Truth. Its efforts resulted in a swift rise to second place in 1967–1968; the show would remain in the upper end of the ratings chart until 1978. CBS later moved The Secret Storm,  and  Love Is A Many Splendor Things to 3 p.m. two soap operas that reputedly served as the model 
for unsuccessfully going up against Another World.

The 1970s
On March 30, 1970, Another World became the first daytime soap to produce a spinoff series, Somerset, which ran until 1976. For Somerset’s first year, the two shows shared the same branding, with the mother show titled Another World in Bay City and the daughter show Another World in Somerset. NBC and Procter and Gamble discontinued this after a year; Somerset eventually veered away from Another World’s romantic and domestic storylines, developing into more of a crime drama like its sister Procter and Gamble soap opera The Edge of Night airing on CBS at the time so title references to one-another were dropped, as were crossover stories.

With the arrival of Harding Lemay, Another World would consolidate its place as not only the most popular and critically acclaimed soap opera on NBC, but one of the highest-rated soap opera of the decade. Between 1973 and 1978, it consistently attained second place in the ratings chart and tied with As the World Turns (its Procter and Gamble sister) for first place twice—in the 1973–1974 and 1977–1978 television seasons. The earlier triumph was no mean feat when one considers that CBS put up its star game show The Price Is Right against it for two years.

When the one-hour 10th anniversary special in spring 1974 proved a massive ratings success, NBC and Procter and Gamble made the decision to expand to 60 minutes permanently on January 6, 1975, replacing the original version of the game show Jeopardy!, in a scheduling shuffle with the in-house-produced How to Survive a Marriage moving that show from 3:30 p.m. in between Another World & Somerset  to 1:30 p.m. placing it against As The World Turns causing that show to be canceled months later. Another World became the first serial to broadcast one hour daily, only some six years after the last two 15-minute soaps (CBS' Search for Tomorrow and Guiding Light, also Procter and Gamble shows) had doubled their daily lengths with one show expanding to an hour two years later  and the other show moving to NBC 6 years later.

The show took over the entire 3–4 pm/2-3 Central period, the latter part of which witnessed it beating back, to some degree, CBS' huge Match Game, then daytime's most popular program. However, starting in 1978, Another World began to experience an erosion in ratings caused mainly by the surge in popularity of General Hospital. Another World fell from a first-place tie in 1978  with As the World Turns to eighth in 1979 (a drop from 8.6 to 7.5) but remained NBC's highest-rated daytime drama. Despite the fall in ratings, Another World became the first, and thus far only, soap opera to expand to 90 minutes, a move that proved unsuccessful—it remained in eighth place in the 1979–1980 television season.

Expansion to 90 minutes and its impact on ratings
Although it is widely thought that Another World expansion to 90 minutes was a cause of ratings erosion, the decision to expand the show was made at a time when its ratings (and that of NBC's other serials) were already in steady decline. During the period when Another World ran daily for 90 minutes it remained NBC's highest-rated soap opera, as it had been for a decade. In the second half of 1980, after the show returned to 60 minutes, Another World and fellow NBC serials Days of our Lives and, most dramatically, The Doctors, experienced a collapse in ratings from which NBC's daytime lineup never fully recovered. It would not be until 1983 that both Days of Our Lives and Another World would recover some of their lost ground.

The 1980s
It is possible that the 90-minute format was intended to be temporary, with the added time used to prepare a storyline for a spinoff, Texas in 1980. Upon its debut, the mother show contracted to 60 minutes again, this time moving to 2/1 Central, where it stayed for the remaining 19 years of its run. Texas, starring the hugely popular Beverlee McKinsey and attempting to cash in on the Dallas craze, while itself not a success, may have caused further erosion of Another World viewership, to the point that it was no longer NBC's highest-rated serial, losing that position to Days of our Lives (which itself, along with the rest of NBC's daytime lineup, was in serious ratings trouble). Another World fell from eighth to as low as 11th in the ratings chart, and by the 1981–1982 television season it sank so low in the Nielsens to 4.7 (a drop of 3.9 points in four seasons). Much like General Hospital winning the 3/2 slot for ABC, One Life to Live came in strong at 2/1, with CBS attempting to get its new Capitol off the ground during that period.

After five years of sharply declining ratings, Another World experienced something of a mini-revival, and for the 1983–1984 television season, the show jumped to ninth place and 5.6 (compared with 10th place and 4.8 in 1983). The ratings increase was attributed to the emergence of the paired Sally Frame (Mary Page Keller, later Taylor Miller) and Catlin Ewing (Thomas Ian Griffith), the addition of Linda Dano as chic romance novelist Felicia Gallant who was brought on to bring an element of glamour to the show, and the return of actress Jacqueline Courtney as Alice Matthews Frame, who had been fired from the show nine years earlier despite being immensely popular with viewers.

The show remained in ninth place through the decade (occasionally moving up to eighth), pulling in generally stable numbers against One Life to Live (which was a big ratings hit at the time) and its Procter and Gamble sister soap opera As the World Turns. The show received some of its strongest critical acclaim during the 1980s as well. Many soap critics praised the show for keeping its focus on relationships and family crisis. However, like many soap operas at the time, the show did dive into occasional action/crime storylines such as the Sin Stalker murders in 1987 as a response to the popularity of the action/adventure oriented serial General Hospital during the decade.

The 1990s
In common with other daytime serials, Another World experienced a gradual erosion of viewership but, amazingly enough given its turbulent history, held on to ninth place on the ratings chart from the mid 1980s until the end of its run. While it never showed signs of moving up through this period, it was for the most part never in danger of falling to last place.

In early 1995, Another World was the first daytime soap to eliminate the full-screen closing credits crawl in favor of the one-third screen credits/promo combination. This was implemented by NBC to allow network news and local news outlets to break in with hourly updates on the O. J. Simpson murder case alongside the closing credits. In instances where news updates did not break in, scenes from that day's episode would appear on the left two-thirds of the screen, with the regular closing theme music accompanying it (although the closing theme music was often obscured by voiceover promotional announcements for upcoming NBC programming). The "squeeze credits" trend remained in place on most NBC programs (and quickly spread to other networks) after the Simpson trial concluded; through the end of its run, Another World continued the one-third credits format while its daytime stablemate, Days of Our Lives, barred the network from running its credits in this fashion until 2001.

Between 1974 and 1999, Another World won the Daytime Emmy Award for Outstanding Drama Series only once (in 1976), a stark contrast to five wins for The Young and the Restless and six for General Hospital within that time frame.

List of firsts
Another World was the first soap opera:

 To discuss abortion. In 1964, the subject was a taboo and it was nine years before the Roe v. Wade decision made abortion legal for women in all 50 U.S. states.
 To expand to an hour-long format (1975). After an episode in 1974 which aired for 60 minutes did well in viewer popularity, it was decided to make AW a one-hour show, beginning in early January 1975.  This led to other soaps (as well as game show The Price Is Right) expanding to 60-minute lengths as well.  At one point, AW expanded to 90 minutes (March 1979), but eventually returned to the hour-long format in August 1980, where it remained until the show was cancelled in 1999.
 To spin off new shows.'''  AWs Missy Matthews, Ricky Matthews, Sam Lucas, and Lahoma Lucas, relocated to Somerset from 1970 until 1976. Subsequently, on August 4, 1980, NBC aired its second spin-off by introducing Another World characters Iris Carrington, Dennis Carrington, Reena Cook, Dr. Kevin Cook, and Vivien Gorrow. Those Bay City characters relocated to Houston and launched the hour long serial Texas, which was initially aired in the 3 pm eastern time slot (against the then-ratings powerhouses General Hospital and Guiding Light). Following the premiere of Texas, Another World was shortened from 90 minutes to 60 minutes, and aired in the time slot directly preceding its spin-off series. Texas was cancelled due to poor ratings in December 1982.

Spin-offs
The show spawned two spin-offs: Somerset (1970–1976) and Texas (1980–1982). (In 1970, the two shows were known as Another World: Bay City and Another World: Somerset before reverting to their unique names.) One primetime special aired in 1992: Another World: Summer Desire.

A "viewer-directed," text-based continuation of the series called Another World Today existed online, initially sanctioned by TeleNext Media, the production arm of Procter & Gamble.

Airtimes
While individual NBC affiliates had the right to air any show whenever they wished, most of the affiliates (almost all of them, in the earlier days of television) aired the show when it would be transmitted to the network's direct affiliates.

In the mid-to-late 1990s, when Another World was in its final ratings slump, many affiliates swapped Another Worlds time slot with Days of Our Lives, which usually aired an hour earlier. Other affiliates transferred Another World to their morning schedule.  One station, KXAS, aired Another World on a different local channel (KXTX) that had a programming and promotion agreement with KXAS, for a time in the late 1990s.

The network aired the show at the following times throughout its history:

May 4, 1964, to January 3, 1975: 3:00–3:30 PM
January 6, 1975, to March 2, 1979: 3:00–4:00 PM
March 5, 1979, to August 1, 1980: 2:30–4:00 PM
August 4, 1980, to June 25, 1999: 2:00–3:00 PM

Theme songs
A number of theme songs were used throughout the run of the series. The most sustained was "(You Take Me Away to) Another World," which was performed by Crystal Gayle and Gary Morris. The song was used from 1987 to 1996.

Morris's and Gayle's song was only the second daytime serial theme to become a chart hit; released as a country pop single in 1987, it rose to number 4 on the Billboard Hot Country Singles chart. (The first was "Nadia's Theme" from The Young and the Restless, which had charted on the Billboard Hot 100 in 1976.)

Notable alumni

Many well-known film and television actors and celebrities appeared on Another World early in their careers:

 Scott Bakula (Quentin Mills)
 Christine Baranski (Beverly Tucker)
 Laurie Bartram (Karen Campbell)
 Chris Bruno (Dennis Wheeler)
 Amy Carlson (Josie Watts)
 Gabrielle Carteris (Tracy Julian)
 Justin Chambers (Nick Hudson)
 Alicia Coppola (Lorna Devon)
 Marcia Cross (Tanya)
 Faith Ford (Julia Shearer)
 Morgan Freeman (Roy Bingham)
 Marcus Giamatti (Jeff)
 Joanna Going (Lisa Grady)
 Kelsey Grammer (Dr. Canard)
 Thomas Ian Griffith (Catlin Ewing)
 Jackeé Harry (Lily Mason)
 Anne Heche (Marley Hudson / Vicky Hudson)
 Ruben Santiago-Hudson (Billy Cooper)
 Sarah Hyland (Rain Wolfe)
 Michael Jeter (Arnie Gallo)
 Mary Page Keller (Sally Frame)
 Charles Kimbrough (Dr. Abbott)
 Christopher Knight (Leigh Hobson)
 Jane Krakowski (Tonya)
 Eriq LaSalle (Charles Thompson)
 Matt Lauer (art gallery patron)
 Audra Lindley (Liz Matthews)
 Ray Liotta (Joey Perrini)
 Lindsay Lohan (Alli Fowler)
 Dorothy Lyman (Gwen Parrish Frame)
 Wendie Malick (henchwoman)
 Terrence Mann (Griffen Sanders)
 Nancy Marchand (Irene Kimbalt / Therrese Lamonte)
 Hugh Marlowe (Jim Matthews)
 Rue McClanahan (Caroline Johnson)
 John C. McGinley (Ned Barry)
 Nancy McKeon (birthday party guest)
 Julian McMahon (Ian Rain)
 Debra Messing (Daisy)
 Donna Murphy (Morgan Graves)
 James Noble (Rev. Harris)
 Chris Noth (Jimmy / Dean Whitney)
 Jodi Lyn O'Keefe (Maggie Cory)
 Ed O'Neill (Lenny)
 Paul Perri (Joey Perrini)
 Luke Perry (Kenny)
 James Pickens, Jr. (Zack Edwards)
 Brad Pitt (Chris)
 Billy Porter (Billy Rush)
 Ving Rhames (Czaja Carnek)
 Christopher Rich (Sandy Cory)
 Kim Rhodes (Cindy Brooke)
 Eric Roberts (Ted Bancroft)
 William Converse-Roberts (Blue)
 Howard E. Rollins, Jr. (Ed Harding)
 Gary Sandy (Michael Thayer)
 Don Scardino (Chris Chapin)
 Kyra Sedgwick (Julia Shearer)
 Ted Shackelford (Ray Gordon)
 Tony Shalhoub (Phillipe)
 Henry Simmons (Tyrone Montgomery)
 Jean Smart (bus passenger)
 Rena Sofer (Joyce Abernathy)
 John Spencer (Frank Julian)
 David Strathairn (Dave Wilcox) 
 Susan Sullivan (Lenore Moore)
 Dolph Sweet (Gil McGowan)
 Janine Turner (Patricia Kirkland)
 Mark Valley (Father Pete)
 Paul Wesley (Sean McKinnon)
 Dondre Whitfield (Jesse Lawrence)
 Billy Dee Williams (asst. district attorney)

Others who were dayplayers or extras included:  Dan Futterman, Zach Grenier, Melissa Joan Hart, Frankie Muniz,
Donna Pescow, Reginald VelJohnson, and Ming-Na Wen.

 Elizabeth Ashley (Emma Frame Ordway)
 Atlantic Starr (themselves)
 Theodore Bikel (Henry Davenport)
 Charles Durning (Gil McGowan)
 Dick Cavett (Oliver Twist (a magician))
 Jose Ferrer (attorney Reuben Marino)
 Roberta Flack (herself)
 Crystal Gayle (herself)
 Anita Gillette (Loretta Shea)
 Virginia Graham (herself)
 Donna Hanover (Judge Ellen Landregan)
 David Hedison (Spencer Harrison)
 Liberace (himself)
 Darlene Love (Judy Burrell)
 Marla Maples (dinner date)
 Ronnie Milsap (himself)
 Michael Minor (Royal Dunning)
 Gary Morris (himself)
 Dack Rambo (Grant Harrison)
 Joan Rivers (Meredith Dunston)
 Al Roker (himself)
 John Saxon (Edward Gerard)
 Alexander Scourby (Lowell Pendleton)
 Ann Sheridan (Kathryn Corning)
 Betty White (Brenda Barlowe)
 Chely Wright (herself)

Awards

Daytime Emmy Awards

Drama series and performer categories

Other categories
 1995 "Outstanding Achievement in Music Direction and Composition for a Drama Series"
 1995 "Outstanding Original Song"
 1994 "Outstanding Achievement in Hairstyling for a Drama Series"
 1994 "Outstanding Achievement in Costume Design for a Drama Series"
 1993 "Outstanding Achievement in Hairstyling for a Drama Series"
 1992 "Outstanding Drama Series Directing Team"
 1992 "Outstanding Achievement in Hairstyling for a Drama Series"
 1990 "Outstanding Achievement in Hairstyling for a Drama Series"
 1990 "Outstanding Achievement in Costume Design for a Drama Series" (tied with All My Children)
 1989 "Outstanding Achievement in Costume Design for a Drama Series"
 1975 "Outstanding Drama Series Writing"
 1974 "Outstanding Art Direction or Scenic Design" (tied with The Young and the Restless)

Other awards
 Directors Guild of America Award (1992)

Executive Producers / Head Writers
The following helmed Another World during its 35-year run:

On location tapings
Another World production left the studio to film exterior scenes several times. Some of these locations included:
 Arizona, United States
 Central Park, Manhattan, New York City, United States
 Lake Louise, Banff National Park, Alberta, Canada. 
 Majorca, Spain
 New York (state), United States
 St. Croix, U.S. Virgin Islands
 Wyoming, United States

See also

List of Another World characters

Bibliography
 Julie Poll, "Another World 35th Anniversary Celebration", HarperEntertainment, April 27, 1999.  Retrieved 2015-10-11.
 Gerard J. Waggett, "The Ultimate Another World Trivia Book", Renaissance Books, September 4, 1999. Retrieved 2015-10-11.

Further reading

References

External links

 Another World home page site
 
 Another World Fan Fiction The continuing story of Another World on the Web
 Another World Today webisode sequel website
 The Somerset Register

 
1964 American television series debuts
1999 American television series endings
1960s American drama television series
1970s American drama television series
1980s American drama television series
1990s American drama television series
American television soap operas
NBC original programming
Television series by Procter & Gamble Productions
Daytime Emmy Award for Outstanding Drama Series winners
English-language television shows
Television series created by Irna Phillips
Television series created by William J. Bell
NBC network soap operas
Television shows filmed in New York City